{{DISPLAYTITLE:C13H10N2}}
The molecular formula C13H10N2 may refer to:

 Aminoacridines
 2-Aminoacridine
 3-Aminoacridine
 4-Aminoacridine
 9-Aminoacridine
 Diazodiphenylmethane